Little Hope is an unincorporated community in Bibb County, Alabama, United States.

Little Hope Primitive Baptist Church and Cemetery, established in 1842, are located there.

References

Unincorporated communities in Bibb County, Alabama
Unincorporated communities in Alabama